Berta Bergman (née Bergmann; 1892–1945) was a Yugoslav physician and the first Bosnian woman to finish high school.

Early life 
Bergman was born in Blažuj near Sarajevo. She was the eldest of four daughters of the railway officer Joseph Bergmann, an Ashkenazi Jew who moved from Vienna during the Austro-Hungarian rule in Bosnia and Herzegovina. Despite the family's modest income, Bergman's mother was determined to secure higher education for her daughters. In order to qualify, the girls first had to attend gymnasium; Berta and her sister Marija thus became, in 1905, the first female pupils in Mostar's Velika gimnazija. In February 1912, the Croatian newspaper Narodna obrana reported that Bosnia and Herzegovina got its first female high school graduate, Berta Bergmann. She went on to study medicine in Vienna, graduating in 1918. All her younger sisters received university degrees as well, Marija being the first Bosnian woman awarded a doctorate.

Career 
Bergman's career as pediatrician took her to a number of places in Bosnia and Herzegovina, by then part of the Kingdom of Yugoslavia, including Banja Luka. After quitting her position in Banja Luka, Bergman was awarded money for self-sacrifice and risking her own life. She then worked in Mostar as head of the local children's polyclinic.

After the invasion of Yugoslavia by Nazi Germany in April 1941 and the establishment of the Independent State of Croatia, a fascist puppet state, on the territory which included Bosnia and Herzegovina, Bergman lost her job. Her sister Marija and Marija's family were deported to the Rab concentration camp, while 49-year-old Doctor Bergman joined the Partisan guerrilla resistance movement. She provided the Partisan fighters with medical care, supplies and first aid lessons. She was imprisoned twice; the capture on 15 January 1945 led to her deportation to Jasenovac concentration camp, where she was killed by the Ustaše.

References

Bosnia and Herzegovina Ashkenazi Jews
Bosnia and Herzegovina pediatricians
Bosnia and Herzegovina people of Austrian descent
Women pediatricians
People who died in Jasenovac concentration camp
Bosnia and Herzegovina Jews who died in the Holocaust
University of Vienna alumni
Yugoslav Partisans members
Jews in the Yugoslav Partisans
People from Mostar
1892 births
1945 deaths
Women in the Yugoslav Partisans
Bosnia and Herzegovina military doctors
Yugoslav pediatricians
Resistance members who died in Nazi concentration camps
People of Austrian-Jewish descent